Abure (Aboulé), also known as Abonwa or Akaplass, is a Tano language (Kwa, Niger–Congo) spoken near Abidjan in Ivory Coast.

References

External links
 Listen to a sample of Abure from Global Recordings Network

Potou–Tano languages
Languages of Ivory Coast